George Meyer was a Swiss-born footballer who played as a defender and midfielder for Spanish club FC Barcelona and RCD Espanyol. He was regarded as the best player of Barcelona's early years, playing a pivotal role in the club's first-ever piece of silverware, the 1901–02 Copa Macaya. He was also the vice president of the club and a referee.

Biography 
In the early years of football in Switzerland, it was allowed to play for an indefinite number of teams from other cities as a guest player in friendly games, and Meyer is known to have played at least for Excelsior Zürich and FC Zürich, two teams for whom Joan Gamper also played for roughly at the same time, although it still remains uncertain if Meyer met him during those days or later at Barcelona.

He arrived at FC Barcelona in 1901 under unknown. He played with Barcelona for three years until 1904, netting 11 goals in 35 games, and winning the 1901–02 Copa Macaya and the Copa Barcelona in 1903, the former being the very first official title of the club. He was also vice-president of the club in the 1903-04 season. He was a personal friend of Joan Gamper and Walter Wild, the fundamental head behind Barcelona's foundation and the club's first-ever president, respectively.

In 1902, Meyer was a member of the historic Barcelona side that also included Gamper, Udo Steinberg, Alfonso Albéniz, the Morris brothers (Enrique and Samuel) and Arthur Witty, which participated in the Copa de la Coronación (predecessor of Copa del Rey), starting in the final as a defender, conceding two goals in a 1–2 loss to Club Vizcaya.

In 1904 he had certain differences with Gamper that led to his departure for RCD Espanyol, where he played the 1904–05 season before retiring. He had a glass eye that fall to the ground in several matches.

The date and circumstances of his death are unknown.

Honours

Club
FC Barcelona
 Copa Macaya: 
 Champions: 1901–02

 Copa de la Coronación: 
 Runner-up: 1902

References

1879 births
FC Barcelona players
FC Zürich players
People from Winterthur
Swiss expatriate footballers
Expatriate footballers in Spain
Swiss expatriate sportspeople in Spain
Swiss men's footballers
Association football midfielders
Association football defenders
Year of death missing